Metnet (Metropolitan Educational Telecommunications Network) is a distance learning network for the MnSCU college and universities system.  Metnet is one of the six major educational telecommunications networks of the Learning Network of Minnesota.

Services

Email
Metnet currently provides three email services: Gophermail, METNET WebMail 3.0, and METNET WebMail 2.0.  Webmail 3.0 and Webmail 2.0 are being discontinued on January 3, 2011.

All email addresses, or "Internet IDs" are assigned by Metnet based on the first four letters of the user's last name, e.g. "jone0012@metnet.edu"

Participating Colleges
Anoka Technical College
Anoka-Ramsey Community College-Coon Rapids Campus
Anoka-Ramsey Community College-Cambridge Campus
Century College
Dakota County Technical College
Hennepin Technical College-Brooklyn Park Campus
Hennepin Technical College-Eden Prairie Campus
Inver Hills Community College
Metropolitan State University
Minneapolis Community and Technical College
Normandale Community College
North Hennepin Community College
Saint Paul College
University of Minnesota

Logo
The logo of Metnet is the seven-county metropolitan area of Minneapolis-St. Paul.

References

Distance education institutions based in the United States
American educational websites